Phùng Khoang Station is a metro station in Hanoi, located in Hà Đông, Hanoi.

Station layout

Line 2A

References

External links
Phùng Khoang Station

Hanoi Metro stations